Kisha Lee (born July 11, 1985) is an American professional basketball player for the South West Metro Pirates of the NBL1 North. She played college basketball for UNLV.

UNLV statistics

Source

Professional career
Lee's first two professional seasons were spent in Europe, playing for Dutch team Celeritas-Donar in 2007–08, and then Austrian team BC Powerbasket Wels in 2008–09. After a stint with the Bundaberg Bears of the Queensland Basketball League (QBL) during the 2009 Australian winter, Lee returned to Europe for the 2009–10 season, joining Swiss team Helios Basket. She then had a stint with the Chicago Steam in 2010 before moving to England to play for the Sheffield Hatters. She helped the Haters win the 2010–11 EBL championship.

Between 2011 and 2013, she played three straight seasons in the QBL with Bundaberg (2011) and the Toowoomba Mountaineers (2012–13). She returned to the Sheffield Hatters for the 2013–14 EBL season before re-joining the Mountaineers for the 2014 season. In 2015, she split her year with Toowoomba and in Darwin with Ansett. In 13 games for Ansett, she averaged 19 points per game.

In August 2016, Lee joined the Perth Lynx of the Women's National Basketball League (WNBL). Following the 2016–17 WNBL season, Lee remained in Perth and played in the State Basketball League (SBL) for the Stirling Senators. She continued on in the SBL in 2018 and 2019, playing for the Cockburn Cougars. In June 2019, Lee left the Cougars and returned to Queensland, where she joined the USC Rip City.

In 2020, Lee played for the Gold Coast Rollers of the Queensland State League (QSL). In 2021, she joined the South West Metro Pirates of the NBL1 North.

References

External links
Kisha Lee at unlvrebels.com

1985 births
Living people
American expatriate basketball people in Australia
American expatriate basketball people in Austria
American expatriate basketball people in the Netherlands
American expatriate basketball people in the United Kingdom
American women's basketball players
Basketball players from Chicago
Forwards (basketball)
Perth Lynx players
21st-century American women